Dearborn Heights District 7 is one of the three public school districts in Dearborn Heights, Michigan. The Crestwood School District is located in the city's northern side, while the Westwood School District is located in the city's southwest side.  District 7 has six active schools. The superintendent is Ty Weeks.

History 
After being left out in the unification process of Dearborn Public Schools in 1966, District 7 was on its own. At the time, District 7 had a total of 1,414 students living within the designated areas of Dearborn Heights. The school district had no schools in which to educate these students. "Part of the agreement with the state involving the Dearborn school merger was that children in D7 remaining in south Dearborn Township could attend Dearborn Public Schools for a reduced rate of $50 per student in grades K–8 and $188.50 for grades 9–12. State school aid was $113.50 for high schools, leaving D7 to pay the $75 difference as well as busing costs to the schools attended."

Through the years 1947–1967, Dearborn District No. 7 built seven schools to remove itself from the Dearborn Public Schools. "At a school board meeting Nov. 29, 1966, when the board was also deciding on the name for its new high school, the board decided to change the district's name from Dearborn District No. 7 to Dearborn Heights District 7."

Dearborn Heights District 7 contains these six schools: Annapolis High School, Oakley W. Best Middle School, and Madison, Pardee, Polk, and Bedford Elementary Schools. As of the 2009–2010 school year, Dearborn Heights District 7 had been given a "B" grade by the Education YES program of the state of Michigan.

Dearborn Heights District 7 once contained Eton and Mayfair Elementary Schools (Eton is now the Eton Senior Center, while Mayfair has been razed). Also, the original Best Middle School was located in the current building of Annapolis High School.

References 

Dearborn Heights, Michigan
School districts in Michigan
Education in Wayne County, Michigan
1944 establishments in Michigan
School districts established in 1944